Lagynana is a subclass of foraminifera which comprises Astrorhizata with membranous or pseudochitinous tests that may have ferruginous encrustations or more rarely small quantities of agglutinated material.  The Lagynacea Schultze, 1854, of the Allogriomiina, (Loeblich and Tappan 1964) is fairly equivalent. 
 
Genera with flagellate gametes are included in the Lagynidae, those with amoeboid gametes are included in the Allogromiidae.

References

 V.I. Mikhalevich et al.Morphological classification of foraminerfera. 
 Alfred R. Loeblich Jr and Helen Tappan, 1964. Sarcodina Chiefly "Thecamoebians" and Foraminiferida; Treatise on Invertebrate Paleontology, Part C Protista 2. Geological Society of America and University of Kansas Press.

Foraminifera
SAR supergroup subclasses